Geeska Afrika (lit. 'The Horn of Africa') is a Somaliland Somali-language newspaper owned by Geeska Media Group, It was founded in 2006 and is published in Hargeisa, the capital of Somaliland .
In April 2017, it became the second newspaper in Somaliland to publish its papers in color, after Dawan, following twelve years of black and white.

See also
 List of newspapers in Somaliland
 Telecommunications in Somaliland
 Media of Somaliland

References

External links
Geeska Afrika

2006 establishments in Somaliland
African news websites
Newspapers published in Somaliland
Daily newspapers published in Somaliland
Publications established in 2006
Newspapers published in Hargeisa
Somali-language newspapers